Erenga is an ethnic group of Sudan. In Kulbus province of West Darfur in Sudan the members of this group are at about 30% of the population. The members of this group speak 
Sungor language, a Nilo-Saharan language. Their population was estimated to be around 35,000 according to a 1996 source.

Culture 
The Erenga are mainly pastoralists who raise goats, cattle, and camels. They also engage in subsistence agriculture.

The Erenga have a clan system where the Shali, Awra, and Girga clans are some of the most influential groups.

Most Erenga are Muslim.

References

External links
Information on ethnic groups in Kulbus province

Ethnic groups in Sudan